The following is the list of players in the AFL Women's (AFLW) who have either made their AFLW debut or played for a new club during the 2021 AFL Women's season.

Summary

AFL Women's debuts

Change of AFL Women's club

See also 

 List of AFL debuts in 2021

References

Australian rules football records and statistics
Australian rules football-related lists
Debut
Lists of sportswomen